The Barton Bulldogs (formerly known as the Atlantic Christian Bulldogs) are the athletic teams that represent Barton College, located in Wilson, North Carolina, in intercollegiate sports at the Division II level of the National Collegiate Athletic Association (NCAA), primarily competing in the Conference Carolinas since the 1930–31 academic year. The Bulldogs are the only remaining founding member of the conference.

Barton competes in 24 intercollegiate varsity sports. Men's sports include baseball, basketball, cross country, football, golf, lacrosse, soccer, swimming, tennis, track and field (indoor and outdoor), and volleyball; while women's sports include acrobatics and tumbling, basketball, cross country, golf, lacrosse, soccer, softball, swimming, tennis, track and field (indoor and outdoor), and volleyball.

Conference affiliations 
NCAA
 Conference Carolinas (1930–present)

Varsity teams

National championships

2006–07 men's basketball 
On March 24, 2007, the men's basketball team won the NCAA Men's Division II Basketball Championship.  The team, with a 31–5 record in 2006–07, defeated the previously undefeated defending champion Winona State Warriors, who held a Division II-record 57-game winning streak at the time.  Winona State looked to repeat as champs, taking a 74–67 lead with 45 seconds remaining.  Barton's Anthony Atkinson then scored 10 points in the last 39 seconds, including the winning layup at the buzzer for a 77–75 victory.
Atkinson has since become a fan favorite with the Harlem Globetrotters.

Team

Notable alumni

Baseball 
 Bill Brooks
 Billy Godwin

References

External links